In applied mathematics, weak duality is a concept in optimization which states that the duality gap is always greater than or equal to 0.  That means the solution to the dual (minimization) problem is always greater than or equal to the solution to an associated primal problem.  This is opposed to strong duality which only holds in certain cases.

Uses
Many primal-dual approximation algorithms are based on the principle of weak duality.

Weak duality theorem
The primal problem:
The dual problem,

The weak duality theorem states .

Proof:

Generalizations

See also
Convex optimization
Max–min inequality

References

Linear programming
Convex optimization